Duke Ping of Chen (reigned 777 BC – died 755 BC), given name Xie (燮), was the tenth ruler of the ancient Chinese state of Chen during the transition period from the Western Zhou dynasty to the Spring and Autumn period. Ping was his posthumous name.

Duke Ping was a younger son of Duke Wu of Chen, who died in 781 BC and was succeeded by his elder son Duke Yi of Chen. However, Duke Yi died in 778 BC after only three years of reign, and Duke Ping succeeded his elder brother as the ruler of Chen.

In 771 BC, the seventh year of Duke Ping's reign, the Western Zhou dynasty was destroyed when the Quanrong nomads killed King You of Zhou and occupied the Zhou heartland, forcing the Zhou court to move east to Luoyang. Duke Ping reigned for 23 years and died in 755 BC. He was succeeded by his son Yu, known as Duke Wen of Chen.

References

Bibliography

Monarchs of Chen (state)
8th-century BC Chinese monarchs
755 BC deaths